A clonewheel organ is an electronic musical instrument that emulates (or "clones") the sound of the electromechanical tonewheel-based organs formerly manufactured by Hammond from the 1930s to the 1970s. Clonewheel organs generate sounds using solid-state circuitry or computer chips, rather than with heavy mechanical tonewheels, making clonewheel organs much lighter-weight and smaller than vintage Hammonds, and easier to transport to live performances and recording sessions.

The phrase "clonewheel" is a play on words in reference to how the original Hammond produces sound through "tonewheels". The first generation of clonewheel organs used synthesizer voices, which were not able to accurately reproduce the Hammond sound. In the 1990s and 2000s, clonewheel organs began using digitally-sampled real Hammond sounds or digital signal processing emulation techniques, which were much better able to capture the nuances of the vintage Hammond sound. 

Clonewheel organs can be either electronic keyboard-based instruments such as the Korg CX-3 or the Roland VK-7; or keyboardless emulation devices, which include MIDI-compatible tone modules, such as the E-MU B-3 module and software-based "virtual synths" (such as the B4 by Native Instruments [discontinued]). To use keyboardless emulation devices, they need to be connected to a MIDI keyboard controller.

History

Original electromechanical Hammond

The Hammond organ is an electromechanical organ that was designed and built by Laurens Hammond in 1934.  While the Hammond organ was originally sold to churches as a lower-cost alternative to the pipe organ, it came to be used for jazz, blues, and then to a greater extent in rock music (in the 1960s and 1970s) and gospel music.

The original Hammond organ imitated the function of a pipe organ's ranks of pipes in multiple registers by using additive synthesis of waveforms from harmonic series to generate its sounds. The Hammond organ's individual waveforms were made by mechanical tonewheels which rotated beneath electromagnetic pickups. The component waveforms can be mixed in varying ratios by using drawbars mounted above the two keyboards. Hammond organs also have a harmonic percussion effect, in which the 2nd and 3rd harmonic tones can be added to the attack envelope of a note.

Hammond organs have a distinctive percussive key click, which is the attack transient that occurs when all nine key contacts close, causing an audible pop or click. Originally, key click was considered to be a design defect and Hammond worked to eliminate or at least reduce it by using equalization filters. However, some performers liked the percussive effect, and it has become part of the classic sound that modern imitators of the Hammond organ have tried to reproduce.
The classic way of enhancing the sound of a Hammond organ is to use a rotating speaker known as a Leslie speaker or cabinet.

First "clones"

Transporting the heavy Hammond organ, bass pedalboard (a B-3 organ, bench and pedalboard weighs 425 pounds/193 kg) and Leslie speaker cabinets to performance venues makes it cumbersome for artists to tour with a vintage electromechanical organ. As well, the Hammond, as with all vintage electromechanical instruments, faces the risk of technical problems with the tonewheels or electric motor, which may be difficult to resolve in a touring situation. As such, there was a strong demand amongst musicians for a way of recreating the Hammond sound in a more portable, reliable fashion.

Some early emulation devices from the 1970s were criticized for their unrealistic imitation of the Hammond sound, particularly in the way the upper harmonics were voiced, and in the simulation of the rotary Leslie speaker effect. Refinements to Hammond emulations eventually led to the development of relatively light electronic keyboard instruments such as the Korg CX-3 (1980), and the Roland VK-1 (1980), which produced fairly realistic re-creations of the Hammond tone. While these instruments were widely used to replace the bulky Hammonds for band tours and club dates, jazz and blues keyboardists still tended to use vintage Hammonds for recordings, because the first clonewheel organs could not reproduce the tonal nuances of the old wooden Hammonds.

1990s and 2000s

By the 1990s and 2000s digital signal processing and sampling technologies allowed for better imitation of the original Hammond sound, and a variety of electronic organs, emulator devices, and synthesizers provided an accurate reproduction of the Hammond tone, such as the Kurzweil K2600 and Clavia Nord Electro keyboard. Hammond Suzuki USA currently markets numerous home, church, and professional models that digitally reproduce the sound of vintage Hammond tonewheel organs. Some sophisticated emulation devices have algorithms that recreate many of the nuances of vintage Hammonds, such as the "crosstalk" or "leakage" between tonewheels, the sound of dirty key contacts, key click, a growling tube amplifier, and digital simulations of the rotating Leslie speaker cabinet.

Currently, there are numerous B-3 "clones" on the market, which range from full-size, dual keyboard behemoths with real Leslie cabinets from Hammond Suzuki (which can cost over $10,000 US), to inexpensive Casio WK series home keyboards that have a digitally-recreated "tonewheel organ" function (which are available for less than $400 US). In between are numerous keyboard-based models from Hammond, Korg, Roland, Clavia (Nord Series), rack-mounted modules, and software-based "virtual synths" (such as the B4 by Native Instruments) which provide simulations of the B-3 sound. There is even a model by the Pari.E company which uses a modern version of the classic Hammond tonewheels, not a digital simulation.

The use of Hammond clones and the merits of using clones versus the vintage electromechanical Hammond is the subject of lively debate amongst musicians. The argument that digital simulations cannot recreate the complex interplay of variables that create the "Hammond sound" (tonewheel leakage, Leslie speaker rotation, etc.) is supported by a review of clones in  Keyboard Magazine. The article, entitled "Clonewheel Heaven", reviewed electronic simulations of the traditional Hammond sound, and claimed that some aspects of the vintage electromechanical Hammonds' sound are not accurately reproduced by clones and emulation devices. Nevertheless, the increasing use of clonewheel organs on recordings by jazz and blues organ solo players is testimony to their sound and tone quality; it is also worth noting the wide variety of tonal variations that exist even among genuine vintage tonewheel Hammond organs. Owing to any number of causes — not least of which are the age of its components and the amount of use a tonewheel organ has had — variations in volume levels between tonewheels, varying levels of key click, and other tonal differences are more common than not.

Despite the widespread availability of relatively lower-cost, reliable digital "clones" and emulation devices, and the near-universal use of "clones" for band tours and club gigs, many jazz, blues and gospel keyboardists still have a strong interest in using vintage Hammond organs for studio recordings. Even if a clone is able to accurately reproduce  the vintage electromechanical Hammond sound — several companies such as Clavia and Hammond Suzuki are making  this claim — performers still have an affection for the look, feel,  characteristics and heritage embodied in the much heavier, old wooden vintage instruments.

Format

Clonewheel organs are available in several formats. The first is an integrated keyboard, in which the keyboard and the circuitry that provides the tonewheel emulation is in the same chassis. A second approach is a sound module, a tabletop device which only provides the organ sounds; it must be connected to a MIDI controller keyboard to be used. The tabletop units vary in sophistication. The least sophisticated units provide a selection of commonly-used tonewheel sounds. More sophisticated units may have drawbars and a number of knobs and buttons for controlling the sound. The third format is as a virtual instrument, which requires a computer and monitor. The virtual instrument may depict the same types of controls that a real tonewheel organ would have on the monitor. The musician then uses a computer mouse or other input to change the settings.

Instruments

Pre-clonewheel organs

Early drawbar organs inspired by Hammond
 Vox (designed by JMI, manufactured by JMI, Thomas, Eko and EME)
 Continental / Continental I (1962–c.1971), Continental II / Super Continental (1966/1967–c.1972), Riviera (1966–c.1972)
 Yamaha A-3 (1966), YC-10 (1969), YC-20 / YC-30 (1970), YC-25D / YC-45D (1972)
 Ace Tone TOP-1 (1968/1969), TOP-6 (c.1970)
 WLM Organ (1972–1984, made in Finland)

Hammond and related models

 Ace Tone  GT-5, GT-7  (1971, predecessor of Hammond/Sakata models)
 Hammond (manufactured by Sakata)  X-5 (c.1974/1975), X-2 (1978), B-200
 Roland VK-9, VK-6, VK-09  (c.1978, spin off from Ace Tone)

Italian drawbar organs
 Farfisa Professional, Professional Duo (early '70s) VIP series ('70s), Professional 88 and 110 (1977/78),
	and console models "Maharani" and "Pergamon"
 Crumar Haven, Organizer, Organizer2, Organizer T1, T2, Tokata, portable models from 1976 to 1980,
	and consoles 203, 204, 205, 2002, 2003
 Elka X50 (1982), X55, X605 and X705 (1977–1981)
 Solton Legend (1980s), B-1000 (c.1977, CRB Diamond 910M) / B 1000 s (c.1981)

etc..

Early clonewheel organs

 Hammond  B-3000  (1976/1978, utilizing LSI for multiplexing, etc.)
 Korg  CX-3, BX-3  (1980, analog)
 Roland  VK-1  (1980, analog)
 Hammond (manufactured by Suzuki)  Super-B  (1986, a first all-digitally sampled organ from Hammond)

Major clonewheel organs

 Hammond Suzuki XB-1, XB-2 (1991), XB-5 (1993), XB-3 (1994), XC-3 (1995),
	XM-1 / XMc-1 (1997, module), XM-2 / XMc-2 (2006, module),
	XK-2 (1999), XK-3 / XLK-3 (2004), XK-1 (2006), XK-3c (2008), SK1 / SK2 (2011),
	and console models New B-3 (2002), New B-3 mk2, and XH-272 Elegante.
 Korg New CX-3  and New BX-3  (2000)

 Clavia Nord Electro Series (2001–), Nord Stage Series (2005–), Nord C1 / C2 / C2D Combo Organ (2007–), Nord Pedal Key 27 MIDI pedalboard
 Kurzweil K2500, K2600, PC2, PC2X, PC3, PC3X, PC3K, PC3A (KB3 mode, modeled tone wheel)
 Roland Rhodes VK-1000, Roland VK-7, VK-77, VK-8, VK-8m, VK-88, VR-760, VR-730 and VR-09 (V-Combo)

Others
 Böhm Emporio
 Casio CTK-691/900/7000/etc., WK-3000/3200/3300/3700/3800/etc. – providing digital drawbar organ function.
 Creamware B4000 (Tonewheel synthesizer)
 Diversi Musical Instruments DV-Solo, DV-Duo, DV-Duo Plus
 Ferrofish B4000+
 E-MU B-3 module

 KeyB/DLQ www.keyborgan.com KeyB Duo, KeyB Solo, KeyB Expander
 Oberheim OB-3, OB-32 ([Oh-Bee-Three-Squared], module) and OB-5
 Roland Atelier AT-900, AT-900c, AT-800
 Studiologic Numa Organ
 Tokai TX-5
 Vermona Formation 1, 2, 3 and 3M
 Viscount DB-3, DB-5,  Legend, Live, Solo,
 Voce  microB-II V3, V5, V5+ and Key5
 Wersi Louvre, Scala, Verona, Giga Piano – a German company.
 Yamaha Reface YC (2015)
 KeyboardPartner HX3 (Hardware-based physical model) – www.keyboardpartner.com

Software
 There are also software emulations available:
 GSi VB3 (shareware, VST plugin)
 Linplug Organ 3 (previously known as daOrgan)
setBfree (open source, standalone or plugin)
 Native Instruments B4, B4 II

Controllers
 Hamichord M-C3 (powered by GSi VB3 Hamichord edition II)Hamichord had been distributed (or produced) by BG's Musical Instruments (BGMI), then its successor model under Crumar brand has been introduced as following:
 Crumar MOJO  (powered by GSi VB3 version II)

Electromagnetic tonewheel organs
 PARI.E K-61 (2006–c.2010s) – an Italian-made B-3 clone which uses an actual electromagnetic tonewheel generator, albeit of modern plastic construction. Also Leslie-clones were made.

See also
Hammond organ
Organ trio

Notes

References
  (officially supported by Hammond U.K.)

Electronic organs
Electric and electronic keyboard instruments